Gadzhibey was one of eight Fidonisy-class destroyers built for the Imperial Russian Navy during World War I. Completed in late 1917, too late to see active service during the war, Gadzhibeys sailors joined the Bolsheviks after the October Revolution. In early 1918, the destroyer assisted in the consolidation of Soviet control over Crimea, fighting against Crimean Tatar forces at Yalta and Alushta. After the German-Ukrainian invasion of Crimea, she was withdrawn to Novorossiysk and scuttled there in June to avoid capture by German forces. Raised by the Soviet Union in the late 1920s, Gadzhibey was deemed uneconomical to repair and scrapped. Her propulsion machinery was used to refit a sister ship.

Design and description 

Her crew numbered 136.

The Fidonisy-class ships mounted a main armament of four single 102 mm Pattern 1911 Obukhov guns. Unhappy with the reliability of the  anti-aircraft gun that was originally intended to be installed aboard Gadzhibey, the navy replaced them with a pair of  Hotchkiss guns which were installed while the ship was still under construction in March 1917, and four  Maxim machine guns. The destroyers mounted four triple  torpedo tube mounts amidships with a pair of reload torpedoes and could carry 80 M1908 naval mines. They were also fitted with a Barr and Stroud rangefinder and two  searchlights.

Construction and service 
All of the ships received names in honor of the victorious battles of Admiral Fyodor Ushakov. Among these was Gadzhibey, an alternate name for the Battle of Tendra, commemorating Ushakov's victory there during the Russo-Turkish War of 1787–1792.

Furthermore, the Ukrainian sailors of Gadzhibey put forward a resolution, appealing to the Russian sailors of the fleet "in the hope of finding sympathy in our natural desire for national identity."

The destroyer raised the Red flag on the next day, becoming part of the Red Black Sea Fleet, before participating in the Soviet takeover of Yalta in January 1918. Between 23 and 24 April, as German troops advanced into Crimea, she landed an amphibious detachment at Yalta, which, reinforced by local Red Guards, advanced on Alushta, held by Crimean Tatar rebels who welcomed the German advance. The destroyer bombarded Alushta before the city was captured by the amphibious detachment, who again shot Crimean Tatars in retaliation for killings of Russians by Crimean Tatars.

The ship was raised by the Black Sea team of EPRON on 6 December 1928. On 4 January 1929 she was towed to Nikolayev for reconditioning, and in 1930 was transferred to Rudmetalltorg for scrapping as extensive damage to her hull made repair impractical. Her well-preserved main and auxiliary propulsion machinery was installed on her sister  during the refit of the latter between 1930 and 1932.

References

Bibliography

Further reading
 

 

Fidonisy-class destroyers
1916 ships
Ships built at Shipyard named after 61 Communards